Fukuivenator ("hunter of Fukui Prefecture") is an extinct genus of therizinosaurian theropod dinosaur from the Early Cretaceous of Japan.

Discovery and naming
 
The type species Fukuivenator paradoxus was in 2016 named and described by Yoichi Azuma, Xu Xing, Masateru Shibata, Soichiro Kawabe, Kazunori Miyata and Takuya Imai. The generic name combines a reference to the Fukui prefecture with Latin venator, "hunter". The specific name refers to the paradoxical combination of traits shown by the species. 

The rocks in which the skeleton of Fukuivenator, holotype FPDM-V8461, was found in August 2007 belong to the Kitadani Formation, which is probably of Barremian or Aptian age. Radiometric dating of nearby rock units has given this formation an estimated age of somewhere between 127 and 115 million years old. The holotype consists of a partial skeleton with skull. The skeleton of F. paradoxus is currently the most complete non-avian dinosaur fossil found in Japan. The remains, including about 160 bones and bone fragments, were not found in articulation and recovered from an area of fifty by fifty centimetres.

Description
 
Fukuivenator had an estimated length of 245 centimetres and an estimated weight of twenty-five kilogrammes. Distinctive traits include spatulate teeth in the front praemaxillae, pointed, recurved and unserrated teeth in the maxillae and a long neck with elongated neck vertebrae.

Classification

The anatomy of Fukuivenator shows a unique combination of primitive and advanced coelurosaurian features. A phylogenetic analysis performed by the research team that described Fukuivenator found it to be a primitive member of the group Maniraptoriformes, in an unresolved position equally closely related to ornithomimosaurs, maniraptorans, and Ornitholestes. Several similarities with the Dromaeosauridae were explained as a case of convergent evolution. A 2021 study determined it a basal member of the therizinosaurs, as shown below:

Paleobiology

Diet
Because of the long neck and the heterodont unserrated teeth, the probably foremost of which had flattened outer ends, the describing authors suggested that Fukuivenator was no longer a pure carnivore but had adapted itself to a herbivorous or at least omnivorous diet.

See also
2016 in paleontology

References

Prehistoric maniraptorans
Fossil taxa described in 2016
Fossils of Japan
Early Cretaceous dinosaurs of Asia